Vanessa Cristina Höller Noel (born 1971) is a pageant titleholder, was born in Caracas, Venezuela in 1971. She is the Miss Venezuela International titleholder for 1990.

She was the official representative of Venezuela to the Miss International 1990 pageant held in Osaka on 16 September  1990, when she classified in the Top 15 semifinalists. She has two children. She also competed in the national beauty pageant Miss Venezuela 1990 and obtained the title of Miss Venezuela International. She represented Portuguesa state.

References

External links
Miss Venezuela Official Website

1971 births
Living people
People from Caracas
Miss Venezuela International winners
Miss International 1990 delegates